Bryan McCabe (born June 8, 1975) is a Canadian former professional ice hockey defenceman who played in over 1,000 games in the National Hockey League (NHL) playing for the New York Islanders, Vancouver Canucks, Chicago Blackhawks, Toronto Maple Leafs, Florida Panthers and New York Rangers.

McCabe moved to Calgary, Alberta, at a young age and spent the majority of his minor hockey career playing in the Calgary area. Drafted out of the Western Hockey League (WHL) 40th overall by the New York Islanders in 1993, McCabe competed in the 1995 Memorial Cup and was named to back-to-back WHL first All-Star teams during his major junior career. He began his NHL career with the Islanders before stints with the Vancouver Canucks and Chicago Blackhawks. In 2000–01, McCabe began a seven-season tenure with the Toronto Maple Leafs, where he played the majority of his career.

Internationally, McCabe competed for Canada, winning gold medals at the 1997 World Championships, 1994 and 1995 World Junior Championships and the 1992 Pacific Cup. He is also a one-time Olympian, having represented Canada at the 2006 Winter Olympics in Turin.

Playing career 
McCabe began playing junior hockey with the Medicine Hat Tigers of the Western Hockey League (WHL) in 1991–92. After one and a half seasons in Medicine Hat, he was traded to the Spokane Chiefs. He completed the 1992–93 season with 60 points in 60 games split between the Tigers and Chiefs. That summer, he was drafted 40th overall by the New York Islanders in the second round of the 1993 NHL Entry Draft.

Once drafted, he returned to the Chiefs in 1993–94 and put up a junior career-high 84 points in 64 games. In his fourth and final year of junior, he was traded to the Brandon Wheat Kings for the remaining 20 games of the 1994–95 season, and he put up a total of 69 points in 62 games and was chosen as a first-team WHL All-Star.

In 1995–96, McCabe began his NHL career with the Islanders. He recorded 23 points in his rookie season before being traded to the Vancouver Canucks midway through his third year (along with Todd Bertuzzi and a third-round draft pick in 1998, used to select Jarkko Ruutu) in exchange for Trevor Linden. He played one-and-a-half seasons with the Canucks before being traded to the Chicago Blackhawks on the day of the 1999 NHL Entry Draft in a bid by Canucks general manager Brian Burke to draft Daniel and Henrik Sedin second and third overall, respectively. McCabe was packaged with Vancouver's first-round draft pick in 2000 in exchange for Chicago's first-round pick in 1999.

On October 2, 2000, after a 6-goal, 25-point campaign with the Blackhawks in 1999–2000, McCabe was traded once again to the Toronto Maple Leafs in exchange for Alexander Karpovtsev and a fourth-round pick (Vladimir Gusev) in the 2001 NHL Entry Draft. McCabe found his stride in Toronto and built on a 17-goal, 43-point breakout season in 2001–02 with 53 points two seasons later, culminating in a fourth-place finish in James Norris Memorial Trophy voting Second Team All-Star honours.

As NHL play was suspended due to the 2004–05 lockout, McCabe signed with HV71 of the Swedish Elitserien. He struggled with HV71 and exercised an escape clause in his contract before a game against Södertälje SK, where he was scheduled to be a healthy scratch. He had one goal, no assists, 30 penalty minutes and a –12 rating over ten games.

When NHL play resumed the following season, McCabe emerged with a career-high 19 goals, 49 assists and 68 points in 73 games with the Maple Leafs. He finished the season third overall in points among NHL defencemen, behind Nicklas Lidström and Sergei Zubov. Near the beginning of the season, McCabe was recognized as the NHL's Offensive Player of the Week for November 13–19, 2005, and was later named as a reserve on Team Canada's 2006 Winter Olympic team in Turin.

Following McCabe's career year, on June 28, 2006, he signed a five-year, $28.75 million contract extension with Toronto that included a no-movement clause. He scored 57 points in 82 games the following season.

In the dying seconds of overtime against the Buffalo Sabres on October 15, 2007, McCabe scored in his own net; the goal was credited to Paul Gaustad. McCabe was the focus of numerous trade rumours during the 2007–08 season, and on September 2, 2008, he was ultimately traded to the Florida Panthers (along with a fourth-round draft pick in the 2010 NHL Entry Draft) in exchange for defenceman Mike Van Ryn.

McCabe was named team captain of the Florida Panthers on September 23, 2009, and on November 6, 2009, he played in his 1,000th game in the NHL.

On February 26, 2011, McCabe was traded to the New York Rangers in exchange for forward Tim Kennedy and a third-round draft pick.

McCabe announced his retirement from the NHL on February 15, 2012.

International play 
While in junior, McCabe was a member of three gold medal-winning Canadian teams, the first of which was at the 1992 Pacific Cup in Japan. The under-18 tournament was in just its second year of what is now known as the Ivan Hlinka Memorial Tournament. at the 1994 and 1995 World Junior Championships. In 1995, he was named to the tournament All-Star team and was honoured as Best Defenceman after posting 12 points in 7 games.

After joining the NHL, McCabe appeared in three consecutive World Championships, in 1997, 1998, and 1999, capturing gold in 1997.

On December 21, 2005, McCabe was named as a reserve for Canada at the 2006 Winter Olympics in Turin. On February 2, 2006, he was moved from the reserves to the official roster to replace an injured Ed Jovanovski. Canada would fail to defend its 2002 Olympic gold medal and was eliminated by Russia in the quarter-finals.

Post-playing career
Since 2017, McCabe has been the director of player personnel with the Florida Panthers.

Career statistics

Regular season and playoffs

International

Awards and achievements 
WHL
 West second All-Star team – 1993
 West first All-Star team – 1994
 East first All-Star team – 1995
 Memorial Cup All-Star team – 1995

International
 World Junior All-Star team – 1995
 World Junior Best Defenceman - 1995

NHL
 Offensive Player of the Week - November 13–19, 2005
 Second All-Star team – 2004

Personal life
McCabe met his wife Roberta, a native of Long Island, during his stint with the New York Islanders, and together they have two daughters and one son. They live in Delray Beach, Florida, and the family also has a home on Long Island.

References

External links 
 

1975 births
Brandon Wheat Kings players
Canadian expatriate ice hockey players in Sweden
Canadian ice hockey coaches
Chicago Blackhawks players
Canadian ice hockey defencemen
Canadian people of Irish descent
Florida Panthers coaches
Florida Panthers players
HV71 players
Ice hockey people from Ontario
Ice hockey players at the 2006 Winter Olympics
Living people
Medicine Hat Tigers players
National Hockey League All-Stars
New York Islanders draft picks
New York Islanders players
New York Rangers players
Olympic ice hockey players of Canada
Spokane Chiefs players
Sportspeople from St. Catharines
Toronto Maple Leafs players
Vancouver Canucks players